Baisley Park Houses is a housing project in South Jamaica, Queens, New York and completed on April 30, 1961. The development consists of five, 8-story buildings with 386 apartment units for an estimated 1,057 people. It covers a 7.48-acre expanse, and is bordered by the Long Island Rail Road, 116th Avenue, Foch and Guy Brewer Boulevards.. It is owned and managed by New York City Housing Authority (NYCHA).

Notable residents 

 Kenneth "Supreme" McGriff (born 1960), leader of gang The Supreme Team

Nicki Minaj

See also
New York City Housing Authority
List of New York City Housing Authority properties

References

Residential buildings in Queens, New York
Public housing in Queens, New York
1961 establishments in New York City
Residential buildings completed in 1961